Leonard William Andrews (4 November 1922 – 12 August 2010) was an Australian rules footballer who played with Hawthorn in the Victorian Football League (VFL).

Personal life
Andrews served as a signalman in the Australian Army during the Second World War.

Notes

External links 

1922 births
2010 deaths
Australian rules footballers from Melbourne
Hawthorn Football Club players
Australian Army personnel of World War II
Australian Army soldiers
People from Elsternwick, Victoria
Military personnel from Melbourne